Typocerus is a genus of beetles in the family Cerambycidae, containing the following species:

Species
 Typocerus acuticauda Casey, 1913
 Typocerus badius (Newman, 1841)
 Typocerus balteatus Horn, 1878
 Typocerus confluens Casey, 1913
 Typocerus deceptus Knull, 1929
 Typocerus fulvocinctus Knull, 1956
 Typocerus gloriosus Hopping, 1922
 Typocerus lugubris (Say, 1824)
 Typocerus lunulatus (Swederus, 1787)
 Typocerus octonotatus (Haldeman, 1847)
 Typocerus serraticornis Linsley & Chemsak, 1976
 Typocerus sinuatus (Newman, 1841) – Notch-tipped Flower Longhorn
 Typocerus sparsus LeConte, 1878
 Typocerus velutinus (Newman, 1841) – Banded Longhorn Beetle
 Typocerus zebra (Olivier, 1795) – Zebra Longhorn Beetle

References

External links
 Genus Typocerus, BugGuide

Lepturinae